Čtvrtá hvězda (The Fourth Star) is a Czech television sitcom that premiered on Czech Television from January 6 to March 24, 2014. It was filmed by Jan Prušinovský and Miroslav Krobot with the screenplay contribution of Petr Koleček. The complete ensemble of the Dejvice Theater performed in the main roles.

Plot
A young countryman, Štěpán Koláček (Václav Neužil), who has just returned from a stay in England, gets a job as a night receptionist at the run-down Libeň Hotel Meteor, where his old uncle František (Ivan Trojan) is already employed. Štěpán falls in love with his colleague Pavlína (Martha Issová), who is a daily receptionist at the hotel. He therefore only sees her when there is a shift change. In addition, Štěpán has a more successful partner - he is Pavlína's partner, die-hard Sparta fan and occasional lover of hotel manager Tereza (Lenka Krobotová), hotel maintenance worker David (David Novotný). Tereza is pursuing her dream of getting a fourth star for the three-star Hotel Meteor. Her phlegmatic ex-husband Theodor (Martin Myšička), who holds the post of hotel director, does not help her in any way. His only interest is in improving himself in the Chinese game of mahjong. The story thus follows the difficult journey to obtain the fourth star, spiced up by the vicissitudes of various workplace relationships between more or less bizarre characters.

Cast
Václav Neužil as Štěpán, new night receptionist
Ivan Trojan as František, Štěpán's uncle, night receptionist and thief
David Novotný as David, repairman
Martha Issová as Pavlína, day reptionist
Martin Myšička as Theodor, director
Lenka Krobotová as Tereza, manager
Simona Babčáková as Jiřina, bartender
Miroslav Krobot as Tichý, chef
Jaroslav Plesl as Smutný, chef
Marek Taclík as Jindra, taxi driver
Klára Melíšková as Libuška, hotel hostess
Pavel Šimčík as Major
Jana Holcová as Oksana, cleaning lady
Pavlína Štorková as Alena, cleaning lady
Lukáš Příkazký as policeman
Hynek Čermák as priest
Radek Holub as Uran
Jan Kašpar as guest
Taťjana Medvecká as Štěpán's mother

External links
Website (in Czech)
IMDb.com

References 

Czech comedy television series
2014 Czech television series debuts
Czech Television original programming